The 2017 South Florida Bulls football team represented the University of South Florida (USF) in the 2017 NCAA Division I FBS football season. They played their home games at Raymond James Stadium in Tampa, Florida, and were led by first-year head coach Charlie Strong. The Bulls competed as members of the East Division of the American Athletic Conference. They finished the season 10–2, 6–2 in AAC play to finish in second  place in the East Division. They were invited to the Birmingham Bowl where they defeated Texas Tech.

Previous season
In 2016, the Bulls had their most successful season in school history, finishing 11–2, 7–1 in American Athletic Conference play. They finished as co-champions of the East Division, but lost out on participating in the Conference Championship Game on a tie-breaker to Temple. They received an invitation to the Birmingham Bowl.

Before playing in the Birmingham Bowl, head coach Willie Taggart was hired by Oregon. Interim head coach T. J. Weist led the Bulls to victory in the bowl game, beating South Carolina 46–39 in overtime.

Offseason

Coaching changes
The coaching vacancy left by Willie Taggart was filled when USF hired Charlie Strong as head coach on December 11, 2016. Strong had been the head coach at the University of Texas before being fired after three seasons.

Sterlin Gilbert was named the new offensive coordinator on January 5, 2017. Gilbert had been Charlie Strong's offensive coordinator at Texas in 2016. USF hired Brian Jean-Mary as the new defensive coordinator on January 8, 2017. Jean-Mary has been on Charlie Strong's coaching staff since Strong started coaching at Louisville in 2010. He was Texas's linebackers coach in 2016.

Disciplinary issues
In late March 2017, senior USF defensive back Hassan Childs was dismissed from the team after being involved in a road rage incident in which he was shot three times. He was charged with aggravated assault and marijuana possession after the incident.

In early May, another USF player was arrested, this time defensive end LaDarrius Jackson, who was charged with assaulting a female in student housing. Judge Margaret Taylor, of Hillsborough County, criticized head coach Charlie Strong's lack of control over his players, saying that she was "ashamed of being an alum." Coach Strong had only been employed at the school for five months at the time of Jackson's arrest and had not recruited either of the players in question. A video of Judge Taylor's comments went viral, and she later recused herself from the case.

Preseason
In the preseason AAC media poll, the Bulls were picked to finish first in the East Division of the AAC, receiving all 30 first-place votes. They also received 26 of 30 votes as the favorite to win the AAC championship.

Schedule
South Florida announced their 2017 football schedule on February 9, 2017.

The game between UMass and USF was cancelled. The game between Cincinnati and USF was moved from October 28th to October 14th.
The game between Houston and USF was moved from November 4th to October 28th.
The game between UConn and USF that was cancelled on September 9th was rescheduled for November 4th.

Game summaries

at San Jose State

Stony Brook

Illinois

Temple

at East Carolina

Cincinnati

at Tulane

Houston

at UConn

Tulsa

at UCF

vs. Texas Tech–Birmingham Bowl

Rankings

Roster

Players in the 2018 NFL Draft

References

South Florida
South Florida Bulls football seasons
Birmingham Bowl champion seasons
South Florida Bulls football